Homalorhagida is an order of kinorhynchs.

Families
Neocentrophyidae Higgins, 1969
Pycnophyidae Zelinka, 1896

References

Kinorhyncha
Protostome orders